Bahmanabad or Behmanabad may refer to:

Places in Iran
Bahmanabad, Chaharmahal and Bakhtiari
Bahmanabad, East Azerbaijan
Bahmanabad, Ilam
Bahmanabad, Shahr-e Babak, Kerman Province
Bahmanabad, Andika, Khuzestan Province
Bahmanabad, Behbahan, Khuzestan Province
Bahmanabad, Haftgel, Khuzestan Province
Bahmanabad, Kurdistan
Bahmanabad, Sabzevar, Razavi Khorasan Province
Bahmanabad, Birjand, South Khorasan Province
Bahmanabad, Zirkuh, South Khorasan Province
Bahmanabad, Tehran

Other places
 Bahmanabad, near Hyderabad, Pakistan, a candidate for the location of ancient Regio Patalis